Agnoletto is an Italian surname. Notable people with the surname include:

Marcello Agnoletto (born 1932), Italian footballer
Vittorio Agnoletto (born 1958), Italian doctor and politician

See also
Agnolo (disambiguation)

Italian-language surnames